The Hadiya Kingdom is one of the strongest kingdoms before the formation of the current Ethiopia. This state was known so long before the birth of Jesus chirst. The history and culture Christof of Hadiyya has been studied and Christdocumented by the Europe  Christ documented by the European writers, Arab tavellers and scholars from Ethiopia. one of the early mentions of Hadiyya in the Abyssinian documents is in chrstian chronicles or Kibre Negest, which is dated back to 13th century. The northern Abyssinian king came to the Hadiyya Land where he planed to rob the people. But the strongest Hadiyya king (Garad) fought him back and Hadiyya has never been tributary to the Christiaking'sking'sn kings loyalty.

In a book: History of the Hadiyya in Southern Ethiopia, compiled by Ulrich Braukamper,  it is revealed that Hadiyya country is wide and geographically covers the areas between the Romanian Mogadishu and the current Ethiopian lake Abaya. This state was owned and ruled by the Hadiyya people, who speak the Cushitic Hadiyya language.

The historical Hadiyya area was not limited to be situated between the current area, the Gamo and southwest of Shewa. By 1850, Hadiya is placed northwest of Lake Zand northwest of Langano but still between these areas. Hadiya was historically like the state of the Adal federation and an opponent of Abyssinia.

The Hadiya Kingdom was described in the mid-fourteenth century by the Arab historian Chihab Al-Umari as measuring eight days' journey by nine, which Richard Pankhurst estimates 160 by 180 kilometres. The land of Hadiyya was fertile with Weesa, cereal and cereals, and rich with horses, and its inhabitants used pieces of iron as currency, which is called Hakuna. It could raise an army of 40,000 cavalries and at least twice as many foot soldiers.

￼Wogana￼￼ 

the Hadiyya Peole are known for owning livestock herd, and when an individual owns one hundred or thousand cattle, he gets a honorary name ￼mahasrasncho or in some occasion, Garaads. ￼ thes ceremony on this day is called wogana. 

The current Hadiya Zone of the Southern Nations, Nationalities, and Peoples' Region is located in approximately the same area as this former kingdom. These are, Booyyaamo,  Leemo, Weexogiira,  Dooda and others. However, many of the former Hadiyya clans are currently known by their clan names rather than the communal ethnonym: Hadiyya. These are, Kabeena, Libido of Marako, Halaba,  Silte, Gadabaano/Wolane and many others. Hadiyya clans in Arsi of the Oromiya region are worth it to mention in this regard. There are so many clans of Hadiyya in Wolayta, Kambata,  Gurage, Afar,  Somali and Tigray.

Kabeera

Kabeera is the struggle name of Hadiyya combatants, who fight against oppressors and work hard to preserve their identity. They are also known for strongly organized movements to ensure Hadiyya's social, political and economic power. One of the leading figures of Kabeera is ￼Melese Abraham Wolebo. He is the manager of Hadiyya Media House and Lecturer of Anthropology at Wachemo university. ￼

Melese Abraham has been imprisoned more than three times in the Hadiyya Zone and SNNPRS capital for being the influential leader of the  powerfulpowerfull struggle of the Hadiyya Kabeera. Aman general, Bethlehem Seifu, Aschalewu Gebeyehu, and many more are also part of the historical movement to stand firmly for the betterment of their ethnic group.

Kabeera the combatants of Hadiyya are known for their bravery to preserve and develop the Hadiyya Identity as well as promoting the Hadiyya culture and struggle to ensure economic and sociopolitical equality and freedom of their ethnic group. One of the known figures in telese Abraham, who has been imprisoned more than three times for his strong and influential leading role in the struggle of the Hadiyya Kabeera. He is currently manager at Hadiyya Media House ( www.youtube.com/c/HadiyyaMediaHouseHMH)  and Anthropology lecturer at Wachemo University.

History
Hadiya was likely part of the domain of the Sultanate of Showa and linked to the Harla before the pagan Kingdom of Damot's invasion led by Sidama. A cluster of speakers labelled Hadiya-Sidama developed, maintaining Islamic identity and later creating the Hadiya Sultanate. According to Hadiya elders the dynasty was started by descendants of Harar Emir Abadir, who intermarried with Sidama. The earliest surviving mention of Hadiya is in the Kebra Nagast (ch. 94), indicating that the kingdom was in existence by the 13th century. Another early mention is in a manuscript written on the island monastery of Lake Hayq, which states that after conquering Damot, Emperor Amda Seyon I proceeded to Hadiya and brought it under his control using Gura armies from modern Eritrea which would later become Gurage region. Later during Amda Seyon's reign, the King of Hadiya, Amano, refused to submit to the Emperor of Ethiopia. Amano was encouraged in this by a Muslim "prophet of darkness" named Bel'am. Amda Seyon subsequently set forth for Hadiya, where he "slew the inhabitants of the country with the point of the sword", killing many of the inhabitants while enslaving others. Despite such punitive measures, many of the Hadiya people served in the military units of Amda Seyon.

In the fourteenth century according to professor Lapiso, the Hadiya state within the "Hadiya-Harla Sultanate" maintained one of the largest armies in the region, consisting of 80,000 infantry and 40,000 cavalry. During the reign of Zara Yaqob, the Garad or Sultan of Hadiya, Mahiko, the son of Garaad Mehmad, repeated his predecessor's actions and refused to submit to the Abyssinian Emperor. However, with the help of one of Mahiko's followers, the Garaad was deposed in favor of his uncle Bamo. Garaad Mahiko then sought sanctuary at the court of the Adal Sultanate. He was later slain by the military contingent Adal Mabrak, who had been in pursuit. The chronicles record that the Adal Mabrak sent Mahiko's head and limbs to Zara Yaqob as proof of his death.

After militarily occupying Hadiya, many kings of Ethiopia and high ranking members converted and married Hadiya women; Princess Eleni of Hadiya is one example. This would escalate pre-existing tensions with the neighboring Adal Sultanate, who did not take kindly to the atrocities committed by Ethiopia against its fellow Muslim state. Adal attempted to invade Ethiopia in response, however the campaign was a disaster and led to the death of Sultan Badlay ibn Sa'ad ad-Din at the Battle of Gomit. Ethiopian and Adal relations continued to sour after the Hadiya incident and reached its peak at the Ethiopian–Adal war, where the Hadiya would join the Adal armies in their invasion of Ethiopia during the sixteenth century. It was revealed during Adal's invasion that the Hadiya state under Abyssinia was forced to pay yearly tribute by offering a Muslim girl to be converted to Christianity. Emperor Sarsa Dengel suppressed a rebellion by Hadiya leader Garad Aze which involved Hadiya ally Sultanate of Harar at the Battle of Hadiya. In the late sixteenth century, the Hadiya region was overrun by the Oromo expansion, thus, the Arsi Oromo today claim Hadiya ancestry.

Identity
Historical definition of Hadiya people includes a number of Ethiopian ethnic groups currently known by other names according to ethnologist Ulrich Braukämper, who lived in various parts of southern-central Ethiopia for over four years during his research. In his book titled A history of the Hadiyya in Southern Ethiopia, he established linkages to the ancient Hadiya Kingdom. Currently, Hadiya is not a homogeneous ethnic group but is rather sub-divided into a number of ethnonyms, partly with different languages and cultural affiliations. They were initially all inhabitants of a single political entity, a Sultanate, which in the 4th centuries following its break-down became remarkably diverse. The Libidoo (Maräqo), Leemo, Sooro, Shaashoogo, and Baadawwaachcho remained a language entity and preserved an identity of oneness, the Hadiya proper; whereas the Qabeena, Allaaba, Siltʼe people, clans of Hadiyya origin in Walayta, parts of the East-Gurage as well as descendants of an old Hadiya stratum living with the Oromo and Sidama developed separate ethnic identities. Hadiya are related to the Harari.

Famous members
 Eleni of Ethiopia
 Garad Aze
 Garaad Amano
 Garaad Bimado
 Garaad Mahiko
 Garaad Bamo 
 General Bezabih Petros 
 Melese Abraham 
 Professor Beyenr Petros 
 Athlete Fantu Megiso 
 Artist Abulo Tumoro 
 Artist Sintayehu Tilahun Hibongo￼

See also
 Hadiya people
 Hadiya Zone
 Hadiyya language
 Assan Enjaamoo

Notes

References
Braukämper, Ulrich. (1980), Geschichte der Hadiya Süd-Äthiopiens: von den Anfängen bis zur Revolution 1974, Wiesbaden: Franz Steiner Verlag (Studien zur Kulturkunde 50).
Braukämper, Ulrich. (2005), "Hadiyya Ethnography", in: Siegbert Uhlig (ed.): Encyclopaedia Aethiopica, vol. 2: D-Ha, Wiesbaden: Harrassowitz Verlag. pp. 961–963.
Braukämper, Ulrich. (2005), "Hadiyya Sultanate", in: Siegbert Uhlig (ed.): Encyclopaedia Aethiopica, vol. 2: D-Ha, Wiesbaden: Harrassowitz Verlag. pp. 963–965.

Former monarchies of Africa
History of Ethiopia
Southern Nations, Nationalities, and Peoples' Region
Ethnic groups in Ethiopia